Luc Mbassi Effengue (1957 – 8 October 2016) was a Cameroonian footballer. He competed in the men's tournament at the 1984 Summer Olympics.

References

External links
 
 

1957 births
2016 deaths
Cameroonian footballers
Cameroon international footballers
Olympic footballers of Cameroon
Footballers at the 1984 Summer Olympics
1984 African Cup of Nations players
Africa Cup of Nations-winning players
Place of birth missing
Association football defenders
Tonnerre Yaoundé players